International Community Radio Taipei (ICRT) is Taiwan's only English-language radio station.  Prior to 1979, the station served the U.S. military personnel in Taiwan as the Armed Forces Network Taiwan (AFNT).  When the United States broke diplomatic ties with the Republic of China in 1979, the American business community, with the help of the ROC government, reorganized the station into ICRT.

History

Origins 

From 1957 to 1979, the station served the US military community in Taiwan as the Armed Forces Network Taiwan (AFNT). After the United States broke diplomatic ties with the Republic of China on Taiwan in 1979, Rear Admiral James B. Linder, last commander of the United States Taiwan Defense Command (USTDC), informed a letter to the Taiwanese Government Information Office (GIO) pointing out that equipments of the AFNT be transferred to the ROC Government by the US Federal Government without compensation. The new radio station, under the name of ICRT, was reorganized by the American Chamber of Commerce in Taipei (AmCham) and the ROC government.

Early period 

ICRT enjoyed immense popularity during its first fifteen years. The station offered two channels: AM 200 and FM 989. Both channels provided similar content of foreign pop and rock, with the difference that FM100 also had daily five-minute news at the top of every hour, one-hour morning and evening news programs, and three hours of classical music on Sunday nights.

ICRT’s news coverage was renowned. Live top-of-the-hour news segments were broadcast 24 hours-a-day. Members of the news team were often dispatched to report live from the scene of an event. ICRT’s news coverage was also noted for covering controversial or sensitive political topics at a time when Taiwan was just coming out of martial law. In a period heavily dominated by a KMT-leaning media, ICRT gave a voice to the opposition party, facilitating a fair exchange of ideas.

1990s 

The station started to suffer from operating challenges in the 1990s. The ROC government liberalized the radio market, forcing ICRT to face competition from other radio stations.  AM576's programming lineup became weaker and lacked DJs to cover the entire twenty-four hours of air time, resulting in an automated jukebox system to replace the DJ. Eventually AM576 only broadcast the BBC World Service and CNN Radio and then went permanently off the air in 1999. News coverage in FM100 was gradually downsized. In 2000, ICRT moved from its original location on Yangmingshan to Taipei City.

ICRT today

News and current affairs 

ICRT provides news throughout the day, beginning with content from the BBC, then moving into an hour-long morning news special, in which the morning crew cover local, international, sport and business news.

Taiwan Talk 

In 2012, ICRT launched a new feature called Taiwan Talk, a twice-weekly program designed to enhance ICRT’s local news coverage. Hosted by reporter Eryk Smith up until the end of 2013, the news segment features interviews with members of the local community. Notable past interviewees include Taiwan 2012 presidential candidate Tsai Ying-wen, Indian novelist Pankaj Mishra, National Immigration Agency Director, Hsieh Li-kung (謝立功), and William Stanton (diplomat), the director of the American Institute in Taiwan.  Currently the program is hosted by Alex Lewis.

EZ News 

As part of ICRT’s role as a bridge between the foreign and domestic community, two news broadcasts per day are designated EZ News. The vocabulary is deliberately simplified, the reading speed is lowered, and a transcript is provided to aid English learners. In 2012, an extra podcast was added featuring the EZ News broadcast read at an even slower speed.

Game On! 

Game On! is a segment focused on developments in the world of videogames. It ran from 2009 to 2014.

Cultural exchange

A-Fu's Taxi 

A-Fu's Taxi is a short feature designed to teach simple Chinese. The format is always the same: a foreigner gets into A-Fu’s taxi cab and strikes up a conversation centered on the intended destination. Over the course of this dialogue, A-Fu teaches the foreigner a few Mandarin Chinese words or phrases.

Language Links 

Language Links is a short program designed to teach English vocabulary. It features a dialogue, often humorous in nature, centered on a theme. Key words are then explained in English and Mandarin Chinese. Language Links is also published as an English-learning textbook, in which the dialogues are presented in cartoon form, and extended explanations and information on the same theme is given.

We Love Hakka 

We Love Hakka is a special program, presented in Mandarin Chinese and English, which aims to introduce Hakka language and culture. Hakka sights, proverbs and cultural events are described in the program, along with a few words in the Hakka language.

Notable programming

Jazz Flavors 

Jazz Flavors is a 2-hour, Sunday night show. It is the longest-running program on ICRT.
The show features the very latest music by the top jazz artists of the day. While mostly consisting of modern jazz, the blues, R&B, and Latin are also programmed.

Radio plays 

In 2012, ICRT teamed up with a Taipei-based drama group, Red Room Radio Redux, to begin production of radio plays. The inaugural production was Charles Dickens’ A Christmas Carol, which aired on Christmas Eve and Christmas Day. Planned future productions include Orson Welles’ The War of the Worlds.

Events

ICRT Bike Day 

ICRT regularly holds "bike days": public events in which hundreds of people gather to cycle on scenic routes across Taiwan. The events are curated by station DJs. ICRT held its first bike day in Tainan in June 2009. Since then, each year a bike day event is held in Northern, Central and Southern Taiwan respectively. In the four years since its inception, the ICRT Bike Day has been held 11 times.

Battle of the Bands 

The ICRT Battle of the Bands event has been held six times, beginning in 2007. Local bands are invited to compete in front of a panel of judges and a live audience. The winning band receives a cash prize, musical equipment and the chance to be championed on ICRT. Previous winners of the competition have included High Tide (2008), who went on to perform at the Fuji Rock festival; I.O. (2009), later nominated for "Best Band" and "Best Newcomer" at the Golden Melody Awards; and most recently Trash (2012).

Sources
Fox, Butterfield (22 May 1979). Taiwan Radio in English Beams Assurances on US Ties. The New York Times, p. A2.
Kristof, Nicholas D. (4 January 1992). The Voice of Taiwan Speaks English. The New York Times, p. 4.
Leonard, Andrew (July 1992). Taiwan Twist. Columbia Journalism Review, p. 16.
Phipps, Gavin (16 May 2004). A Quarter Century of Community Radio. Taipei Times, p. 18.

References

External links
Taipei Times article on ICRT

Mass media companies of Taiwan
Radio stations in Taiwan
American Forces Network
Taiwan–United States relations
Radio stations established in 1979